The subfamily Nodicoeloceratinae comprises early Jurassic ammonite genera that lived during early to middle Toarcian stage. Origin of this subfamily is unknown, but first genus Nodicoeloceras has evolved from Dactylioceras (Orthodactylites) or Kedonoceras.

Validity
Sometimes, this taxon is considered to be invalid and is included in Dactylioceratinae. This is not so in the case of scientists that describe Mediterranean faunal province that values phylogenetic, morphological and paleobiogeographical importance of this subfamily.

Taxonomy 
Following genera are members of this subfamily:
Nodicoeloceras Buckman, 1926
Mesodactylites Pinna et Levi-Setti, 1971
Transicoeloceras Pinna, 1966
Telodactylites Pinna et Levi-Setti, 1971
Collina Bonarelli, 1893

References

Ammonitida
Toarcian life
Toarcian first appearances
Toarcian extinctions